The Triumph of Technique: The Industrialization of Agriculture and the Destruction of Rural America is a 2004 book by Robert Wolf.

The Triumph of Technique examines contemporary agriculture and its impact on rural economies. This book has been hailed by leaders of the sustainable agriculture movement as a significant contribution to understanding the depth of the current crisis in agriculture and its implications.

The “technique” of the title refers not only to technologies but to any methods developed for the purpose of achieving predetermined ends. Wolf argues that technique, as he defines it, has taken the art out of farming by transforming it into agribusiness, on a much larger scale.  He claims that this transformation has led to the decline of rural communities.

2004 non-fiction books
Agriculture books
Intensive farming